Radmilla A. Cody born 1975 is a Navajo model, singer, and anti-domestic violence activist who was the 46th Miss Navajo from 1997 to 1998.

She was the first biracial Miss Navajo and thus so far the only Miss Navajo partially of African-American heritage, her nomination sparked considerable debate over Navajo identity. After her tenure, allegations of drug-trafficking and involvement in money-laundering, resulting in her subsequent arrest and imprisonment, led to verbal racial attacks as well as support.

Early life
Cody was born into the  clan of the Navajo Nation. Her father is African-American. She was raised in the rural areas of the Navajo Nation by her maternal grandmother, speaking Navajo. In an interview with Vermont Public Radio, Cody recalled an instance of her grandmother getting upset with her when she spoke English, which, according to her grandmother, was nothing but "walla walla walla." Daily chores included the herding of sheep and occasional weaving. Cody later recalled that this time spent in relative solitude gave her time to practice her early singing skills with the "first audience [being] the sheep", and the surrounding environment gave her an appreciation of the sounds of nature. Since her grandmother had converted to Christianity, another influence was Christian choirs visiting the local church.

Career

In 1997, Cody participated in and won the Miss Navajo contest, an event for which extensive knowledge of Navajo traditions and fluency in the Navajo language are required, rather than the ideals of beauty promoted by Western beauty pageants. After her tenure, she began a career as recording artist.

Cody's songs are a mix of traditional Navajo music and songs incorporating lyrics written by her uncle, Herman Cody. Her first album, entitled Within the Four Directions, which includes the Navajo version of The Star-Spangled Banner (""), appeared in 2000. She won the 2002 Native American Music Award for Best Female Artist for her album Seed of Life, and has since released two more collections, Spirit of a Woman and Precious Friends, in 2005 and 2007, respectively. Her latest album is Shi Keyeh or Songs for the People released in 2011. This album was nominated for Best Regional Roots Album at the 2012 Grammy Awards. Cody was the first Native American singer nominated in this new category which succeeded to great controversy a standalone category for Native American music and Latin Jazz two-year prior to this award ceremony.

In 2002, Cody sang the Navajo version of The Star-Spangled Banner at the Kennedy Space Center as John Herrington became the first enrolled member of a Native American nation to fly into space.

Controversy
In 2003, Cody pleaded guilty to "misprison [sic] of a felony" for wiring $1,000 to her boyfriend who was involved in the trafficking of marijuana in Las Vegas, Nevada, and she admitted to knowing that the money would be used for such illegal activities; she served 21 months in jail. Subsequently, Cody became subjected to public racial attacks, commenting on her African American descent; others voiced support and understanding for her situation due to her boyfriend's being abusive and oppressive. She has since become an activist against domestic violence.

Discography
 Within the Four Directions (2000)
 Seed of Life (2002) 2002 Native American Music Awards Best Female Artist
 Spirit of a Woman (2005)
 Precious Friends (2007)
 Shi Keyah: Songs for the People (2011)

References

External links
 www.radmillacody.com Official website

21st-century Native Americans
Living people
Native American Christians
Black Native American people
Native American activists
Native American singers
Navajo-language singers
Anti-domestic violence activists
Native American female models
1975 births
21st-century American women singers
21st-century American singers
21st-century Native American women
20th-century Native Americans
20th-century Native American women